The second Sarawak state election was held between Saturday, 24 August and Saturday, 14 September 1974 which lasted for 3 weeks. The election was carried out in stages because of lack of communication and transportation systems.

This election was held simultaneously with 1974 Malaysian general election with the exception of Sabah state legislative assembly. The dissolution of the state assembly was carried out with the dissolution of state assemblies from other states and House of Representatives of Malaysian Parliament on 31 July 1974. This was the first time the election was held before 5 years tenure has finished.

A total of 48 seats were contested in this election.

This election saw 375,282 registered voters with 75.1% of the voters cast their votes.

All the 48 seats were contested by Sarawak Barisan Nasional. The coalition was consisting of United Traditional Bumiputera Party (PBB) and Sarawak United Peoples' Party (SUPP).

A total of 47 seats was contested by Sarawak National Party (SNAP) and 4 seats by BISAMAH.

There were 12 independent candidates vying for the seats.

The Belaga seat was not contested by SNAP.

Results 
Barisan Nasional won 30 seats and the remaining 18 seats were won by SNAP.

Summary

Aftermath
Two years after the election, SNAP elected to join BN as component party at federal and state level. This ensured that the state assembly has no main opposition party, until the next state election.

See also
 1974 Malaysian general election
 List of Malaysian State Assembly Representatives (1974–1978)

References 

1974
1974 elections in Malaysia